Jérôme Bel (born 1965) is a French dancer and choreographer.

Biography
Bel discovered contemporary dance at the 1983 Festival d'Avignon, where he saw two important pieces, Nelken by Pina Bausch and Rosas danst Rosas by Anne Teresa De Keersmaeker, which inspired him to study dance. He studied 1984–1985 at the Centre chorégraphique national in Angers. From 1985 to 1991, he danced for a variety of choreographers in France and Italy, including Angelin Preljocaj, Régis Obadia, Daniel Larrieu, and Caterina Sagna. In 1992, he became the assistant to Philippe Decouflé for the ceremonies of the 1992 Winter Olympics in Albertville.

He worked twelve years with Frédéric Seguette. He began choreographing creating provocative and entertaining pieces influenced by performance art and challenging some of the conventions of performance.His first performance name given by the author (1994) is a choreography of objects. His second one, Jérôme Bel (1995) is based on the total nudity of the performers. Shirtology (1997) presents an actor wearing many T-shirts. The show must go on (2001) brings together twenty performers, nineteen pop songs and one DJ.

In 2004, the Paris Opera commissioned from Bel a theatrical documentary about Véronique Doisneau, a dancer in their corps de ballet. In 2005, a residency in Thailand resulted in the piece Pichet Klunchun & Myself, a choreographic dialogue between Bel and traditional Thai dancer Pichet Klunchun. This will be followed by the solo Cédric Andrieux (2009) for Merce Cunningham's eponymous dancer, Isadora Duncan (2019), a piece that portrays this choreographer, Laura Pante (2020) for the eponymous Italian dancer and choreographer, or Xiao Ke (2020) for the eponymous Chinese performer, choreographer and dancer. In 2010, he collaborated with Anne Teresa De Keersmaeker to create 3Abschied. based on Gustav Mahler's Song of the Earth. Disabled Theater (2012) was created for mentally handicapped professional actors from Theater Hora. Dancing as if nobody is watching (2018) and the reading of John Cage's Lecture on Nothing call for a contemplative aesthetic attitude.

Since 2019, for ecological reasons, Jérôme Bel and his company no longer travel by plane for creations and tours. Thus, Dances for Wu-Kang Chen (2020), a portrait of this Taiwanese dancer, Xiao Ke (2020), a performance created with this Shanghai-based choreographer, and Laura Pante (2020), which presents the career of this dancer living in Italy, were all rehearsed by videoconference, performed in the language of the dancers and toured in the country of their performers.

His work has been shown at Tate Modern, London; the Centre Pompidou, Paris; and MoMA, new York. His work has been included in Performa, New York, Kunsten Festival des Arts, Brussels, and Festival d’Avignon as well as dOCUMENTA 13 (2012) in Kassel. Films of his shows have been presented at biennials of contemporary art in Lyon, Porto Alegre, Tirana and at the Centre Georges-Pompidou in Paris and in Metz, at the Hayward Gallery and the Tate Modern in London, and at the Museum of Modern Art in New York).

Choreographic works
 1994 : Name given by the author
 1995 : Jérôme Bel
 1997 : Shirtology
 1998 : The last performance
 2000 : Xavier Le Roy, delegated to choreographer Xavier Le Roy
 2001: The Show Must Go On
 2004 : The Show Must Go On 2
 2004: Véronique Doisneau, solo for Paris Opera dancer Véronique Doisneau
 2005: Pichet Klunchun and Myself, duet by Bel and Pichet Klunchun
 2005: Isabel Torres, solo for dancer Isabel Torres
 2009: Lutz Forster, solo for dancer Lutz Förster
 2009: Cédric Andrieux, solo for Lyon Opera dancer Cédric Andrieux, formerly a longtime member of Merce Cunningham's company
 2010: 3Abschied in collaboration with Anne Teresa De Keersmaeker
 2012: Disabled Theater with the actors of Theater HORA 
 2013 : Cour d'honneur for Festival d'Avignon 
 2015: Gala, premiering at Brussels KunstenFestivaldesArts
 2016 : Tombe for Paris Opera Ballet
 2017 : Posé arabesque, temps lié en arrière, marche, marche... for Lyon Opera Ballet
 2018 : Dancing as if nobody is watching
 2018 : Lecture on nothing, on the homonimous text by John Cage
 2019 : Rétrospective
 2019 : Isadora Duncan
 2020 : Dances for an actress (Valérie Dréville)
 2020 : Xiao Ke 
 2020 : Laura Pante
 2020 : Dances for Wu-Kang Chen
 2021 : Dances for an actress (Jolente de Keersmaeker)
 2021 : Jérôme Bel

Prizes 
 2005 : Bessie Award in New York for The Show Must Go On
 2008 : Princess Margriet Award for cultural diversity, shared with Pichet Klunchun, from the European Cultural Foundation
 2013 : Prix suisses de danse – Création actuelle de danse for Disabled Theater
 2021: Taishin Performing Arts Award for Dances for Wu-Kang Chen

References

External links
Official site
Interview together with Laurent Chétouane for Goethe Institut, by Gudrun Pawelke

Living people
1965 births
People from Montpellier
French male dancers
French choreographers
Contemporary dance choreographers
Contemporary dancers
Bessie Award winners